Joanna Ruth Nichols (born March 4, 1948) is a Canadian writer of fiction for children and young adults, primarily historical fiction and historical fantasy.

Life
Ruth Nichols was born in Toronto. At age 18 she wrote her first novel to be published, A Walk Out of the World. That young-adult fantasy was published by Longmans in Canada and Harcourt Brace in America with illustrations by Trina Schart Hyman, when Nichols was 20 or 21.

She received her B.A. in religious studies from the University of British Columbia, and her M.A. in 1972 and Ph.D. in 1977, both from McMaster University.  She lectured for several years at Carleton University in Ottawa.

Nichols married William Norman Houston in September 1974.  They initially lived in Ottawa and then moved to Toronto.  Despite having experienced success early in life, Nichols' writing career did not flourish.   Her last published novel was historical fiction, "What Dangers Deep", set in the Elizabethan era and was poorly received as it was outside her genre of children's literature.  Other than the few novels she produced as an adult and despite her educational achievements, Nichols never managed to establish a career in any form of gainful employment.

After divorcing in 1998, health problems, including epilepsy, forced Nichols to live in a chronic care facility in Toronto.

Ruth Nichols' novels for young adults are some of the best in the genre of fantasy. Predating Harry Potter by decades, her beautifully written books feature characters with unusual powers, wizards and worlds of wonder where good versus evil. These books alone establish Ruth Nichols as a major Canadian writer.

Awards
Nichols received the Government of India Prize in 1962 for a 100-page biography of Catherine de' Medici.

The Marrow of the World was named Book of the Year for Children by the Canadian Library Association in 1973.

Works 

 A Walk Out of the World (1969), illustrated by Trina Schart Hyman
 Ceremony of Innocence (1969)
 The Marrow of the World (1972), illus. Hyman  – CLA Book of the Year
 Song of the Pearl (1976)
 The Left-Handed Spirit (1978)
 The Burning of the Rose (1990)
 What Dangers Deep: a story of Philip Sydney (1992)

References

Other sources
McMaster University page on Ruth Nichols
Online Guide to Writing in Canada page for Ruth Nichols
Bookrags.com article on Ruth Nichols
Encyclopædia Britannica Online article on Ruth Nichols (registration required for full access)

External links
 Ruth Nichols  in The Canadian Encyclopedia
 
 

1948 births
Living people
Canadian children's writers
Canadian women novelists
Academic staff of Carleton University
McMaster University alumni
Writers from Ottawa
Writers from Toronto
University of British Columbia alumni
Canadian women children's writers